DV8 is a comic book published by Wildstorm. The series revolves around the lives of a group of Gen-Active people (Called DV8, or referred to as "The Deviants"), initially living in New York City under the supervision of Ivana Baiul, who sends them on life-threatening black ops assignments.

Publication history

The series lasted 32 issues. The story including most DV8 members continued in the pages of Gen-Active, a anthology series featuring various Wildstorm characters. Gen-Active, lasted 6 issues.

Writer Micah Ian Wright pitched a relaunch to WildStorm in 2003, but it was not picked up by the publisher. The artist in the book would have been Mark Robinson.

The title returned in June 2010 as an eight-issue limited series called DV8: Gods and Monsters, written by Brian Wood with art by Rebekah Isaacs. The project is something Wood had been trying to get commissioned for years:

Fictional team history

Rather than saving the world, they use their powers for selfish reasons, such as pleasing themselves, indulging in any fancy that comes their way, and not caring about anybody else. They forget that they are all just pawns to Ivana, at the expense of her needs and desires. The members don't like each other, but soon band together for need of survival. This is what stands these rougues apart from most other superhero teams; they aren't heroes, they are not nice people, don't even like each other, and can't even save themselves, let alone the world. 

Later on in the series, Baiul becomes director of International Operations and the team becomes agents of the I.O. as well. At this point some of the members start to develop a conscience about their actions, especially Frostbite.

Unlike Gen¹³, the overall nature of the comic was often very violent and extreme, (even more so in the first few issues), with sexual themes, graphic violence, mild language and dialogue, (especially between the team members), and general recklessness. The character Sideways Bob brought an especially dark, over the top sense of humor to the series.

Creative teams
 Warren Ellis (Writer, #1-8)
 Mike Heisler (Writer, #9-32)
 Brian Wood (Writer, Gods and Monsters #1-8)
 Humberto Ramos (Art, #1-2, #4-7)
 Michael Lopez (Art, #3, Part of #8)
 Juvaun Kirby (Art, Part of #8, #9-13)
 Tom Raney (Art, #14-16)
 Jason Johnson (Art, Part of #11, #17-18)
 Al Rio (Art, #0, #19-30)
 Trevor Scott (Art, #31-32)
 Rebekah Isaacs (Art, Gods and Monsters #1-8)

Characters
 Ivana Baiul - Leader of the antihero group. She is not fully human because cybernetic technology was integrated into certain parts of her body. Generally, she is immoral and very evil. She was the head of International Operations (I.O. until Operation: "Divine Right" occurred.
 Threshold (Matthew Callahan) - Field commander of the Deviants until he betrayed the team and went rogue. He has psionic powers and is very powerful and extremely psychotic. Until going rogue, he was Ivana's romance, then occasionally to Bliss, and later to a sex toy. He is also a half-brother of Sarah Rainmaker.
 Sublime (Rachel Goldman) - Has the ability to alter the density of her body from intangible to rock-hard. Generally, she is tough and does not take crap from anyone.
 Bliss (Nicole Callahan) - Has the ability to stimulate human senses to the point of cardiac arrest and some psychic abilities. Generally, she is immoral and very capable of getting men to give her what she wants. She even was able to seduce her older brother, Threshold (Matthew Callahan). She may be very dangerous, though the Deviants are unaware of that.
 Frostbite (Leon Carver) - Has the ability to absorb heat from any source and leave it ice-cold. Generally, he is the least screwed-up member of the Deviants. After Threshold went rogue, Frostbite was appointed to the team leader, but he was banished by Ivana after losing his powers. Later he faked his death to get off Ivana's radar.
 Powerhaus (Hector Morales) - Has the ability to convert emotional energy into raw power, which increases his strength as well. He was killed in "DV8 Slipstream Annual".
 Copycat (Gem Antonelli) - Has the ability to take control of a person's mind and make them do whatever she wants them to do. Due to an earlier incident, she has four split personalities in addition to her normal persona, as evidenced by a change in the word-balloon font. When ex-team-leader Threshold betrayed the Deviants, he altered Gem's mind and isolated Gem's main personality, preventing the real Gem Antonelli from ever speaking, leaving Gem's body to be occupied only by her other split personalities.
 Soldier (tough)
 Nihilist (rebellious)
 Spy (methodical)
 Little Gemma (cowardly and sweet)
 At the end of the series, it is revealed that Bliss was the actual cause of Copycat's multiple personalities, and whilst in a feedback loop from Freeway, she emerged without them.
 Evo (Michael Heller) - Has the ability to change into forms similar to a wolf, bat, or amphibian. Generally, he is very insensitive and otherwise dark in demeanor.
 Freestyle (Jocelyn Davis) - Has the ability to affect probability by psionically choosing the most favorable course of action based on a number of timelines. She is also very acrobatic and flexible.She was originally frozen in a cryogenic tube for the first few issues. Generally, she is upbeat and not unstable like the others.
 Sideways Bob - Guardian of the group. He has no powers and is psychotic and dangerous. He's missing an eye and lacks hair, and he carries around a disembodied mannequin head he calls Lucille. He told Sublime that she could be his "special awake friend". She didn't know if that was good or not.

Collected editions
Some of the issues have been collected into a trade paperback:
DV8: Neighborhood Threat (collects DV8 #1-6 and ½, 176 pages, Titan Books, October 2002, DC Comics, September 2002)
DV8: Gods and Monsters (192 pages, Wildstorm, May 2011, Titan Books, June 2011)

In other media
A series of trading cards was released in 1996 to coincide with the launch of the comic book series. The base set contained 90 trading cards and included two chase sets; acetate and oversized cards.

A set of 8 mugs were released in 1997. There was a mug for each of the main characters and featured the art of Humberto Ramos.

Notes

References

 DV8 at the International Catalogue of Superheroes